St. Anne's Episcopal School is a private school in Middletown, Delaware. 

The school was founded in 2001 by educators from St. Andrews School in Middletown. The school has two classes in grades Pre-K to 8th. There is also a preschool. The school promotes diversity and gives out 750,000 dollars annually in financial aid. 

St Anne's has a girls field hockey, male and female basketball, male and female soccer, co-ed cross country, boys and girls lacrosse, teams. The school currently runs an indoor soccer league. The school's first headmaster was Harvey Zendt. Peter Thayer replaced him in 2008.

References

External links 
 School website

Schools in Delaware
Middletown, Delaware
Private K–8 schools in the United States
Private elementary schools in Delaware
Private middle schools in Delaware